The dull-coloured grassquit (Asemospiza obscura) is a small bird. It is recognized as a tanager closely related to Darwin's finches.

Distribution and habitat 
It is found in northwestern Argentina, Bolivia, Colombia, Ecuador, Peru and western Venezuela. It is a vagrant to Paraguay and central Brazil.
Its natural habitats are subtropical or tropical moist lowland forest, subtropical or tropical moist montane forest, subtropical or tropical moist shrubland, subtropical or tropical high-altitude shrubland, and heavily degraded former forest.

References

dull-coloured grassquit
Birds of Colombia
Birds of Ecuador
Birds of Peru
Birds of Bolivia
dull-coloured grassquit
Taxonomy articles created by Polbot